Sharon Stevens may refer to:

Sharon Stevens, reporter on KSDK
Sharon Stevens, singer, past member of Boney M.
Sharon Stevens, character in All Tied Up

See also
Candace Camp, writer who used pseudonym Sharon Stephens
Sharon Stephen